The 2021 FedEx Cup Playoffs, the series of three golf tournaments that determined the season champion on the U.S.-based PGA Tour, was played from August 19 – September 5. It included the following three events:
The Northern Trust – Liberty National Golf Club, Jersey City, New Jersey
BMW Championship – Caves Valley Golf Club, Owings Mills, Maryland
Tour Championship – East Lake Golf Club, Atlanta, Georgia

This was the 15th FedEx Cup playoffs since their inception in 2007.

The point distributions can be seen here.

Regular season rankings
The leading 10 players in the FedEx Cup regular season standings qualified for a share of the $10 million Comcast Business Tour top 10 bonus.

Source:

The Northern Trust
The Northern Trust was scheduled for August 19–22. The leading 125 players in the FedEx Cup regular season standings are eligible to play in the event. Louis Oosthuizen (ranked 8) and Patrick Reed (22) did not play, reducing the field to 123. 75 players made the second-round cut at 141 (−1). The final round was delayed until Monday August 23 because of Hurricane Henri.

Tony Finau won the event, beating Cameron Smith in a playoff. The top 70 players in the points standings advanced to the BMW Championship. This included six players who were outside the top 70 prior to The Northern Trust: Alex Norén (ranked 91st to 47th), Erik van Rooyen (76 to 45), Tom Hoge (108 to 48), Harold Varner III (72 to 56), Keith Mitchell (101 to 63), and Harry Higgs (80 to 69). Six players started the tournament within the top 70 but ended the tournament outside the top 70, ending their playoff chances: Matthew Wolff (ranked 59th to 71st), Matt Fitzpatrick (60 to 73), Tyrrell Hatton (63 to 74), Martin Laird (65 to 75), Troy Merritt (69 to 78), and J. T. Poston (70 to 79).

Par 71 course

BMW Championship
The BMW Championship was played August 26–29. 70 players were eligible to play in the event. There was no second-round cut. Patrick Reed withdrew, reducing the field to 69.

Patrick Cantlay won the event, beating Bryson DeChambeau in a playoff.  The top 30 players in the points standings advanced to the Tour Championship. This included two players who were outside the top 30 prior to the BMW Championship: Erik van Rooyen (ranked 45th to 27th) and Sergio García (44 to 28). Two players started the tournament within the top 30 but ended the tournament outside the top 30, ending their playoff chances: Charley Hoffman (29 to 32) and Max Homa (30 to 35).

Par 72 course

Tour Championship
The Tour Championship was played September 2–5 and was contested by the leading 30 players in the FedEx Cup points standings after the BMW Championship, with no second-round cut. Players were allocated a starting score relative to par based on their position in the standings after the BMW Championship. The points leader started the tournament at 10 under par, number two at 8 under par, number three at 7 under par, number four at 6 under par and number five at 5 under par. Players ranked 6 to 10 started at 4 under par, 11 to 15 at 3 under par, 16 to 20 at 2 under par, 21 to 25 at 1 under par and 26 to 30 started at even par. The winner of the Tour Championship won the FedEx Cup. For the purposes of the Official World Golf Ranking, points were awarded based on aggregate scores (total strokes taken, ignoring any starting scores).

Patrick Cantlay won by a stroke from Jon Rahm. Rahm and Kevin Na had the best 72-hole aggregate scores of 266, three better than Cantlay.

Par 70 course

For the full list see here.

Table of qualified players
Table key:

* First-time Playoffs qualifier
DNP = Did not play
WD = Withdrew

References

External links
Coverage on the PGA Tour's official site

FedEx Cup
PGA Tour
PGA Tour events
FedEx Cup Playoffs
FedEx Cup Playoffs
FedEx Cup Playoffs
FedEx Cup Playoffs